[[File:San Romano Battle (Paolo Uccello, London) 01.jpg|thumb|350px|Broken lances lying along perspective lines in Paolo Uccello's The Battle of San Romano, 1438]]

This is a list of artists who actively explored mathematics in their artworks. Art forms practised by these artists include painting, sculpture, architecture, textiles and origami.

Some artists such as Piero della Francesca and Luca Pacioli went so far as to write books on mathematics in art. Della Francesca wrote books on solid geometry and the emerging field of perspective, including De Prospectiva Pingendi (On Perspective for Painting), Trattato d’Abaco (Abacus Treatise), and De corporibus regularibus (Regular Solids),Piero della Francesca, Trattato d'Abaco, ed. G. Arrighi, Pisa (1970). while Pacioli wrote De divina proportione (On Divine Proportion)'', with illustrations by Leonardo da Vinci, at the end of the fifteenth century.

Merely making accepted use of some aspect of mathematics such as perspective does not qualify an artist for admission to this list.

The term "fine art" is used conventionally to cover the output of artists who produce a combination of paintings, drawings and sculptures.

List

References

External links
 Saint Louis University: List of mathematical artists, by field

 
Artists
Lists of artists